Milton is a town in Chittenden County, Vermont, United States. As of the 2020 census, the population was 10,723. According to local legend, the town was named for the English poet John Milton, but the name most likely originated from William FitzWilliam, 4th Earl FitzWilliam, who held the title Viscount Milton and was a supporter of independence for the colonies during the American Revolution.

Milton has a municipal building, school system, library, police force, fire department, rescue squad, several churches, as well as civic and social organizations.

History
Milton was chartered by Governor Benning Wentworth of New Hampshire on June 8, 1763. In February 1782, the town was first settled by William Irish, Leonard Owen, Amos Mansfield, Absalom Taylor, and Thomas Dewey. There were approximately 300 settlers living in Milton by 1795. It was necessary to build a new meeting place, as meeting in private homes would no longer suffice. The Town House was built in 1849. In 1878, it was destroyed by a fire. Early settlers in Milton made most of their income from lumber and potash until 1840, when dairy became popular and butter and cheese were sold. Eventually, milk was also shipped to Boston and New York.
Milton was home of the Catamount Speedway, which operated until 1988. Many racers who have gone through there went on to NASCAR fame, including Shelburne native Kevin Lepage.

Geography
Milton is located in northern Chittenden County, bordered by Franklin County to the north and Grand Isle County to the northwest, across an arm of Lake Champlain. The town includes the community of Milton in the east, as well as the communities of Cozy Corner, West View, Checkerberry Village, and West Milton from east to west across the center of the town. The Lamoille River flows from northeast to southwest across the town, entering Lake Champlain at the town's southwest corner. U.S. Route 2 crosses the east arm of Lake Champlain to Grand Isle from Sand Point, just north of the Lamoille River delta. Sand Bar State Park is located along Route 2.

Demographics

As of the census of 2000, there were 9,479 people, 3,333 households, and 2,609 families residing in the town.  The population density was 184.2 people per square mile (71.1/km2).  There were 3,505 housing units at an average density of 68.1 per square mile (26.3/km2). There were 3,333 households. Of these, 41.6% had children under the age of 18 living with them, 65.8% were married couples living together, 8.7% had a female householder with no husband present, and 21.7% were non-families. Of all households, 15.3% were made up of individuals, and 4.0% had someone living alone who was 65 years of age or older.  The average household size was 2.84 and the average family size was 3.17.

In the town, the population was spread out, with 28.7% under the age of 18, 7.1% from 18 to 24, 35.8% from 25 to 44, 22.6% from 45 to 64, and 5.8% who were 65 years of age or older.  The median age was 34 years. For every 100 females, there were 100.5 males.  For every 100 females age 18 and over, there were 98.8 males.

The median income for a household in the town was $49,379, and the median income for a family was $50,972. Males had a median income of $36,149 versus $27,256 for females. The per capita income for the town was $20,048.  About 4.2% of families and 5.1% of the population were below the poverty line, including 7.0% of those under age 18 and 6.0% of those age 65 or over.

Government

Public safety

In 2008, property crimes increased by 54.9%. The number of incidents for all crime was 706.

The town of Milton maintains a Volunteer Fire Department, a Volunteer Rescue squad, and a fulltime Police Department serving the town 24/7. The fire department was established in 1937, originally operating out of a small station on Main St. In 2003, they were moved to a large new station on Bombardier Rd next to the Town Offices and Rescue Squad. The Milton Rescue Service was established in 1966 by members of the Fire Department for providing transport to the hospital. Today they operate two ambulances for in town and mutual aid calls to neighboring towns and are licensed up to the Advanced EMT level. They are located on Bombardier Rd next to the Fire Department. The Milton Police Department was established in 1968 and provides 24hr 911 assistance and policing to the Town of Milton. Included in their operations is a K-9 units, School Resource officers, and 17 full-time Officers.

Transportation
The Chittenden County Transportation Authority provides weekday commuter bus service. Stops include the Milton Town Office Park & Ride and the Chimney Corner Park & Ride.

Major highways
  Interstate 89
  U.S. Route 2
  U.S. Route 7

Education
Milton Elementary School (MES):

 In May 2012, the Odyssey of the Mind team participated in the World Finals.
 In March 2013, a group of students and teachers from the elementary school were invited to the White House to join First Lady Michelle Obama in planting the kitchen garden in early April. This was, in part, related to the initiatives the school food service director Steve Marinelli implemented that support Let's Move!, as well as his blog.

Milton Middle School (MMS):

 The Odyssey of the Mind team participated in the World Finals in 2010 and 2015.

Milton High School (MHS):

 The Theatre Company produces a musical in the fall and a one-act play in the spring. The one-act is presented at the regional level. Milton's has been chosen to advance to the state level multiple times where it then competes to be selected as one of two schools to represent Vermont at the New England Drama Festival showcase. Milton has done so in 2002 (The Drowned and the Saved), 2004 (Women and Wallace), 2011 (MacBeth), 2012 (A Midsummer Night's Dream), 2014 (Oedipus Rex), and 2015 (Beowulf).
 Milton hosted the New England Drama Festival in 2003.
 In 2016, Milton seniors won first (Meredith Holbrook) and third (Ryan Racicot) place in U.S. Senator Bernie Sanders' annual State of the Union essay contest. Two other Milton seniors (Megan Bromley and Sara Manfredi) were top twenty finalists. Essays of the winners and finalists will be entered into the Congressional Record.
 Since the beginning of the school year of 2014, Milton High School has participated in the production and creation of a series of videos on Youtube that are structured in the format of a television show or news channel named Yellow Jacket Television, named after the district mascot. In this program, students film, edit, and produce their own segments collaboratively in an effort to present a "TV show" to be presented in front of the student body on a monthly basis. Some segments are based around sports, music, news, events, and other various topics and interests.

Businesses
The town is home to the warehouse for Gardener's Supply and a manufacturing facility for Husky Injection Molding Systems.

Auto racing oval Catamount Stadium was located in Milton and many drivers, including Kevin Lepage, raced here during their racing careers.

Minor Funeral Home is located at 237 Route 7 S﻿ and takes great pride in caring for the Vermont families with their Funeral service. They're commitment to provide giving each family they serve the level of care and understanding they deserve.

In popular culture
Milton was a filming location for some of the scenes in the Farrelly brothers movie Me, Myself & Irene, which starred Jim Carrey and Renée Zellweger.

On May 25, 2016, American singer-songwriter Daya performed an exclusive concert at Milton High School; fellow Artbeatz recording artist Symon performed in the concert as well.

Notable people 

 George Allen, born in Milton, noted clergyman and academic
 Heman Allen, U.S. Congressman
 David R. Bean, Wisconsin legislator; was born in Milton
 Edwin E. Bryant, Wisconsin legislator; was born in Milton
 Jean-Paul Cyr, stock car racer
 Luther S. Dixon, Chief Justice of the Wisconsin Supreme Court
 John G. Haskell, born in Milton, architect who designed Kansas public buildings including the Kansas State Capitol
 Michael Hastings, journalist and author
 George LeClair, Major League Baseball pitcher
 John Palasik, Vermont state legislator
 Apollos Smith, born in Milton, wilderness guide, founder of wilderness resort, eponym of Paul Smiths, New York
 Noah Smith, one of the founders of Vermont and a justice of the Vermont Supreme Court
 Donald H. Turner, Minority Leader of the Vermont House of Representatives
 Alson Wood, born in Milton, Wisconsin State Assemblyman
Amaziah Church, founder of Churchville, Peel Regional Municipality, Ontario, was noted in the 1790 census as living in Milton

References

External links

 Milton, Vermont Official Town Website
 The Vermont Encyclopedia, page 206.

 
Burlington, Vermont metropolitan area
Towns in Chittenden County, Vermont
Towns in Vermont